Ruggiero di Lauria was an ironclad battleship built in the 1880s for the Italian Regia Marina (Royal  Navy).

The ship's construction period was very lengthy, beginning in August 1881 and completing in February 1888. She was quickly rendered obsolescent by the new pre-dreadnought battleships being laid down and, as a result, her career was limited. She spent her career alternating between the Active and Reserve Squadrons, where she took part in training exercises each year with the rest of the fleet. The ship was stricken from the naval register in 1909 and converted into a floating oil tank. She was used in this capacity until 1943, when she was sunk by bombs during World War II. The wreck was eventually raised and scrapped in 1945.

Design

The ship had a short forecastle, connected by a hurricane deck to a raised sterncastle. Her superstructure included a small conning tower with a bridge on the forecastle. The ship was fitted with a single, heavy military mast placed amidships. She had a crew of 507–509 officers and men. 

Her propulsion system consisted of a pair of compound marine steam engines each driving a single screw propeller. Steam was supplied by eight coal-fired, cylindrical fire-tube boilers that were vented through a pair of widely spaced funnels at the ends of the hurricane deck.

Ruggiero di Lauria was armed with a main battery of four  27-caliber guns, mounted in two pairs en echelon in a central barbette. She carried a secondary battery of two  32-cal. guns, one at the bow and the other at the stern, and four  32-cal. guns; two of these were placed side by side behind the bow 152 mm gun, and the other two were mounted side by side on the aft superstructure. As was customary for capital ships of the period, she carried five  torpedo tubes submerged in the hull.

The deck sloped downward at the sides to provide additional protection against incoming fire. The barbette had  of steel armor.

Service history

Construction – 1895

Ruggiero di Lauria was laid down at the Regio Cantiere di Castellammare di Stabia shipyard on 3 August 1881 and launched on 9 August 1884. She was not completed for another three and a half years, her construction finally being finished on 1 February 1888. Because of the rapid pace of naval technological development in the late 19th century, her lengthy construction period meant that she was an obsolete design by the time she entered service. In addition, technological progress, particularly in armor production techniques—first Harvey armor and then Krupp armor—rapidly rendered older vessels like Ruggiero di Lauria obsolete.

During the maneuvers, which lasted from 6 August to 5 September, the ships of the Active Squadron simulated a French attack on the Italian fleet. Beginning on 14 October 1894, the Italian fleet, including Lepanto, assembled in Genoa for a naval review held in honor of King Umberto I at the commissioning of the new ironclad . The festivities lasted three days. In 1895, Ruggiero di Lauria, the ironclad , and the torpedo cruiser  were assigned to the 2nd Division of the Italian fleet in the Reserve Squadron. At the time, the ships of the Reserve Squadron were based in La Spezia. Later that year, the squadron stopped in Germany for the celebration held to mark the opening of the Kaiser Wilhelm Canal.

1897–1945
In February 1897, the Great Powers formed the International Squadron, a multinational force made up of ships of the Austro-Hungarian Navy, French Navy, Imperial German Navy, Regia Marina, Imperial Russian Navy, and British Royal Navy that intervened in the 1897–1898 Greek uprising on Crete against rule by the Ottoman Empire. Ruggiero di Lauria deployed to Cretan waters as part of the Italian contribution to the squadron. In March 1897, she broke up a threat to Ottoman Army forces by Cretan insurgents at Heraptera (now Ierapetra) by threatening to bombard the insurgents.

For the periodic fleet maneuvers of 1897, Ruggiero di Lauria was assigned to the First Division of the Reserve Squadron, which also included the ironclads  and Lepanto and the protected cruiser . The following year, the Reserve Squadron consisted of Ruggiero di Lauria, Francesco Morosini, Lepanto, and five cruisers. In 1899, Ruggiero di Lauria, Andrea Doria, and Sardegna took part in a naval review in Cagliari for the Italian King Umberto I, which included a French and British squadron as well. That year, Ruggiero di Lauria and her two sisters served in the Active Squadron, which was kept in service for eight months of the year, with the remainder spent with reduced crews. The Squadron also included the ironclads Re Umberto, Sicilia, and Lepanto. In 1900, Ruggiero di Lauria and her sisters were significantly modified and received a large number of small guns for defense against torpedo boats. These included a pair of  guns, ten  40-caliber guns, twelve  guns, five 37 mm revolver cannon, and two machine guns.

This squadron only entered active service for two months of the year for training maneuvers, and the rest of the year was spent with reduced crews. During the annual training maneuvers in October 1906, a severe storm swept a man overboard, drowning him. During a gunnery competition held during the maneuvers, Ruggiero di Laurias gunners came in last place. In 1908, the Italian Navy decided to discard Ruggiero di Lauria and her sister Francesco Morosini. The former was stricken from the naval register on 11 November 1909. The ship was then converted into a floating oil depot. She was renamed GM45 and stationed at La Spezia until 1943, when she was sunk in shallow water by an air raid during World War II. Her wreck was scrapped after the end of the war in 1945.

Notes

References
 Brassey, Thomas A., ed. (1896). The Naval Annual (Portsmouth: J. Griffin & Co.).
 Brassey, Thomas A., ed. (1899). The Naval Annual (Portsmouth: J. Griffin & Co.).
 
 Brassey, Thomas A., ed. (1907). The Naval Annual (Portsmouth: J. Griffin & Co.).
 Brassey, Thomas A., ed. (1908). The Naval Annual (Portsmouth: J. Griffin & Co.).
 
 
 
 
 
 
 
 Neal, William George, ed. (1896). The Marine Engineer (London: Office for Advertisements and Publication) XVII.

External links
 Ruggero di Lauria (1884) Marina Militare website

Ruggiero di Lauria
1884 ships
Ships built in Castellammare di Stabia
Battleships sunk by aircraft